St Philip Howard Catholic School is an Ofsted rated "outstanding' secondary school for 11-18 year olds located between Chichester and Arundel, in the town of Barnham, West Sussex, England. It supports a strong Catholic ethos, although is open to pupils of all faiths. It holds 'Specialist Humanities College' status and 'Teaching School' status since 2017. In 2016 the school became an academy member of the BOSCO Catholic education trust.

Description
The Headteacher is Mr David Carter and the Chair of Governors is Mr Christopher Kilbane. In July 2022, Carter will step down from his role of Headteacher, and a new one will start in September 2022. There are 1050 pupils on roll

The school serves a wide area that includes but is not limited to Chichester, Arundel, Worthing, Midhurst, Bognor Regis and parts of Littlehampton. It has a sixth form of roughly 250 students, which is open to all faiths. It offers a wide range of subjects to study at A-level.

The sixth form is open for application to both internal students (students that studied at SPH), and external candidates (students that received their secondary education elsewhere). The sixth form does not have a uniform policy, however students must wear their ID card visibly at all times; which they use to enter the front gate.

All pupils are educated in the context of the Catholic tradition. School Church services are held in the sports hall, along with Days of Reflection, (where children go to a church to pray). They offer many subjects for secondary students; English, German, French, Spanish, Science, Maths, Religious Education, Physical Education, Citizenship, History, Geography, Drama, Dance, Music, Art, Computer Science, Media, Creative i/Media, Business Studies, Food Tech, Wood Tech, Graphics, Computer Graphics and Textiles.

The school has 7 houses;
Saint Bernadette's - Pink
Saint Cuthman's - Red
Saint Dunstan's - Green
Saint Edmund's - Orange
Saint Richard's - Blue
Saint Teresa's - Purple 
Saint Wilfred's - Yellow
They compete in many House Competitions, these include Sports Day, Bake Off and The Talent Show. Each year also has a Head of Year, and each form group has two democratically elected Head Boy and Head Girl. Who represent them on Sports Day and in meetings. Pupils pick 3 options with the other six being, Maths, RE, Science (double/triple) English Literature and English Language. The school day has six 50 minute periods, split in three groups of two with break and lunch in between them. The school has three canteens, one in the main hall, one in the Sixth Form Centre and another outside in a Kiosk.

Pastoral
This is run on a heads of year system. Older pupils  work with the teachers to look after younger students and head off emotional issues before they become problems. Sixth formers are trained to act as learning assistants, and work with the staff in Key Stage 3 classes.

School council
The school runs a school junior leadership team made up of 25 students with five students coming from each year group. Senior prefects are chosen in Year 11 and Head Girl and Head Boy are chosen in Year 13. This system is displayed as good practice to visiting head teachers from partnership schools in  Rwanda, Uganda and Ethiopia. Students and teachers share experiences with ES Kagogo

Academics

Key Stage 4 
Students are required to study a core of :
English Language & Literature (worth two GCSEs),
Mathematics (1 GCSE),
Physical Education (not assessed),
Religious Studies (1 GCSE),
Combined (Double) Science (two GCSEs).
In addition, students are required to study four other subjects. These include Triple Science, Spanish, French and German, History and Geography, Art, Music and Drama. There are four D&T subjects and Computer Science. BTECs in 

Ten academic GCSEs is not a suitable programme for every student but it is achieved by many often scoring an 8 or 9 in each. 
Statutory requirements for Citizenship are covered.

Academic Performance 
In 2018 the school was rated the highest in West Sussex against the new 'Attainment 8' Key GCSE subject scores per pupil, including English, Maths, Sciences and Humanities at the end of key stage 4. 1st out of 92 secondary schools. 
The last (2016) Ofsted report rated the school as uniformly "outstanding" across all metrics and the school was also graded 'outstanding' in a Section 48 inspectorate for its Catholic ethos and Christian character.

Extra Curricular
The school offers a variety of clubs and sports including Rugby, Hockey, Basketball, Netball and Football; as well as foreign language clubs, dance and musical theatre and a debating society. The school also offers 3 levels of the Duke of Edinburgh programme and has an orchestra and school band.

Local youth politics
The school participates in the elections for the UK Youth Parliament and the West Sussex Youth Cabinet every year in March, often fielding several candidates.

References

 Philip Howard, 20th Earl of Arundel St Philip Howard.Who the school is named after.

External links
  Ofsted Report
 School website
 EduBase

News items
  A level Success at Philip Howard 2019
  Top A levels results for Philip Howard 2018

Secondary schools in West Sussex
Catholic secondary schools in the Diocese of Arundel and Brighton
School buildings in the United Kingdom destroyed by arson
Academies in West Sussex